Crites is a surname. Notable people with the surname include:

 Alice Crites, Pulitzer Prize winning journalist
Mike Crites (born 1948), American politician
Shirley Crites (1934-1990), American baseball player
Winston Crite (born 1965), American basketball player

See also
Crites, West Virginia, incorporated area in Logan County, West Virginia
Crites, a fictional character in the Critters film series
Gregg-Crites Octagon House, or M. M. Crites house, an octagon house located in Circleville, Ohio